Bullaun is a village in east County Galway, Ireland. It lies 6 km northeast of Loughrea on the R350 regional road. It shares its parish with a village called New Inn.

The townland of Lakafinna, to the south of Bullaun, contains the local water scheme and an old castle. According to local folklore, an unused tunnel runs from the castle to a point close to a house in Ballyara. The river which flows through Bullaun previously contained quantities of fresh water salmon. These salmon stocks have, however, been impacted by overfishing and pollution.

The village also contains St Patrick's church, a pub called the Harbour Bar and is home to the Corcoran's Turoe stone. The home ground for the Sarsfields GAA team is in Bullaun.

See also
 List of towns and villages in Ireland

References

Towns and villages in County Galway